Richard Curzon-Howe may refer to:

Richard Curzon-Howe, 1st Earl Howe
Richard Curzon-Howe, 3rd Earl Howe
Richard Curzon, 4th Earl Howe

See also
Richard Howe (disambiguation)
Richard Curzon (disambiguation)